The Battle of Diyala River took place in 693 BC between the forces of the Neo-Assyrian Empire and the Elamites of southern Iran.

Assyrian expansion
From the 9th century BC onwards, the Assyrians had been expanding their domain from northern Mesopotamia into Judea and Babylon. After defeating the Babylonians in 689 BC, King Sennacherib sought to punish the Kingdom of Elam for its support towards Babylonia.

Battle
Prior to the battle, Sennacherib had sacked a number of Elamite settlements in 694 BC in an attempt to assert his authority over the region. Despite this, the Elamites, with their Chaldean allies from Babylon, managed to raise an army and met the Assyrian forces of Sennacherib in 693 BC at the Diyala River. According to the Assyrian account of the battle, the Elamites were heavily defeated. However, many historians believe that the Assyrians suffered heavy casualties since they failed to launch any invasions in 692 BC. In 647 BC, the Assyrians returned and this time destroyed the Kingdom of Elam.

References and further reading
Battle: A Visual Journey Through 5,000 Years of Combat, by R.G. Grant.

693 BC
Diyala River
Diyala River
Diyala River
7th century BC in Assyria
Sennacherib

pl:Bitwa pod Halule